Bellevue (also Fredonia, Freedonia, Society Hill) is an unincorporated community in Bossier Parish, Louisiana, United States.

Notable person
Guitar Gable (1937-2017), musician, was born in Bellevue.

References

Unincorporated communities in Bossier Parish, Louisiana
Unincorporated communities in Louisiana